Sinpaş Denizli Basket, also known as Pamukkale Üniversitesi Basketbol Kulübü was a Turkish professional basketball club. It was based in Denizli and played in the Turkish Basketball First League. The team was founded by the Pamukkale University Youth Sports Club in 2006. The club changed its name to Denizli Basket in 2014. Their home arena was Pamukkale University Arena in the PAU Kınıklı Campus, with a capacity of 5,000 seats. The team was sponsored by Sinpaş, a construction company in Turkey. The team was dissolved in 2016.

History

Denizli Basket was founded as Pamukkale Üniversitesi Gençlik ve Spor Kulübü by Pamukkale University in 1998. The club participated in EBBL in 1998–99 season for the first time in their history. It was a successful season and they advanced to TB2L. Subsequently, the club ended the basketball organization due to financial reasons.

In 2006, the team reformed as Pamukkale Üniversitesi Basketbol of Pamukkale Üniversitesi Gençlik ve Spor Kulübü. The team began playing in the EBBL for the 2006–2007 season. In the 2007–2008 season, the team was promoted to TB2L as the champion of EBBL. The following season, the team was relegated. Until the 2013–2014 season, the team played moved between TB2L and EBBL (TB3L).

The following season, the club management found sponsors; leading to a subsequent name change to Aydem Pamukkale Üniversitesi. The club increased its budget and signed veteran coach Gökhan Taştimur. The team finished sixth and qualified for the playoffs. In the quarterfinal, Aydem Pamukkale Üniversitesi beat Vestel with a 2–1 series. In the semi-final, Aydem Pamukkale Üniversitesi lost to İstanbul BB with a 3–1 series and lost the promotion chance.

On 12 August 2014, the club changed its name again, this time to Denizli Basket. Currently, the club is called Sinpaş Denizli Basket for sponsorship reasons.

Current roster

Notable players

See also 
 Pamukkale University
 Turkish Basketball Second League

References

External links 

 Sinpas Denizli Basket Official Website 
 Eurobasket.com Page

Basketball teams in Turkey
Basketball teams established in 2006
Sport in Denizli
Student sport in Turkey